Marshall Jake Willock (born 7 April 2000) is a footballer who plays as a defender for Stamford and the Montserrat national team.

Playing career
Marshall began the 2019–20 season on trial with Southern League Premier Division Central side Tamworth. Willock appeared in pre-season friendly games against West Bromwich Albion, Leicester Nirvana and Bilston Town, however a permanent move never materialised. Willock did manage to earn a move to Redditch United, a team he had spent time on loan with the previous season.

Willock signed for Peterborough Sports on 17 September 2019, and made his debut on the same day. Marshall helped his new club to an emphatic 9–0 victory away to local rivals Peterborough Northern Star in the Northants FA Hillier Senior Cup. Willock made his Southern League Premier Division Central debut on 28 September 2019 in a home fixture against Leiston, Marshall came on as a substitute and scored on his debut, helping his new club to an 8–1 victory.

Following a lack of first team opportunities at Peterborough Sports, Willock signed for Northern Premier League Premier Division side Grantham Town on 17 January 2020.

On 31 July 2020, Willock joined Finnish Kakkonen side Kemi City on a two-year deal.

International career

Montserrat
Marshall was called up to the Montserrat national team for the Nations League B in September 2019, for the first two matches of the competition, at 2–1 victory at home to the Dominican Republic on 7 September 2019 and a 1–1 draw at home to Saint Lucia on 10 September 2019, saw Willock named in both matches as an unused substitute.

Marshall did however earn his first international cap playing for Montserrat on 16 November 2019, coming on as a substitute in a Nations League B fixture away to El Salvador. Willock earned his second cap on 20 November 2019, coming on as a 90th minute substitute for Massiah McDonald in a Nations League B fixture away to Saint Lucia.

References

External links

2000 births
Living people
Montserratian footballers
Montserrat international footballers
English footballers
English people of Montserratian descent
Association football defenders
Solihull Moors F.C. players
Bromsgrove Sporting F.C. players
Chesterfield F.C. players
Kettering Town F.C. players
Redditch United F.C. players
Peterborough Sports F.C. players
Grantham Town F.C. players
Kemi City F.C. players
Stourbridge F.C. players
Stamford A.F.C. players
Ilkeston Town F.C. players
Kakkonen players
National League (English football) players
Southern Football League players
Northern Premier League players
English expatriate footballers
Expatriate footballers in Finland
English expatriate sportspeople in Finland